This is a brief list of notable graduates of the University of Hong Kong (HKU). For a detailed version, please refer to the Chinese version of this article.



Faculty of Arts

Faculty of Business and Economics

Faculty of Engineering

Faculty of Law

Faculty of Medicine (Renamed as Li Ka Shing Faculty of Medicine in 2006)

Faculty of Science

Faculty of Social Sciences

See also

References

 
University of Hong Kong